Oak Hill Methodist Episcopal Church, also known as Durham-Oak Hill Methodist Church, is a historic Methodist Episcopal  church in Oak Hill, Greene County, New York.  It was built about 1859 and is a one-story, roughly square shaped frame building of the traditional meetinghouse type.  It features an engaged central tower and Greek Revival style features.

It was added to the National Register of Historic Places in 2006.

See also
National Register of Historic Places listings in Greene County, New York

References

Methodist churches in New York (state)
Churches on the National Register of Historic Places in New York (state)
Churches completed in 1859
19th-century Methodist church buildings in the United States
Churches in Greene County, New York
National Register of Historic Places in Greene County, New York